Latvia competed at the 2020 Winter Youth Olympics in Lausanne, Switzerland from 9 to 22 January 2020.

Medalists
Medals awarded to participants of mixed-NOC teams are represented in italics. These medals are not counted towards the individual NOC medal tally.

Alpine skiing

Boys

Girls

Biathlon

Boys

Girls

Mixed

Bobsleigh

Cross-country skiing

Curling

Latvia qualified a mixed team of four athletes.
Mixed team

Mixed doubles

Ice hockey

Luge

Short track speed skating

Skeleton

See also
Latvia at the 2020 Summer Olympics

References

2020 in Latvian sport
Nations at the 2020 Winter Youth Olympics
Latvia at the Youth Olympics